The Chengdu–Chongqing intercity railway is a  long high-speed railway that connects the cities of Chengdu (Sichuan) and Chongqing in southwestern China, with a maximum speed of . The route passes through most of the same cities that the older Chengdu–Chongqing Railway does, but is significantly shorter due to the greater use of elevated sections and tunnels. The line includes four major elevated sections and two tunnels.

History
Construction on the Chongqing section began on 22 March 2010 while work on the Sichuan section began on 11 November. The final tunnel achieved breakthrough on 16 December 2013 and a single track line was expected to open in first half of 2014. The complete double track configuration was due to be completed by the end of 2014. The line started operation on 26 December 2015, initially to Chongqing North until renovations were completed at Shapingba on 25 January 2018.

Journey time
The railway reduced travel time between Chengdu and Chongqing to 75 minutes, 45 minutes quicker than the previous fastest route via Suining. Travel time was reduced further to only one hour on December 24, 2020 with the introduction of Fuxing trains and  operations on the line.

An additional line is planned which will offer a faster journey time when complete, the Chengdu–Chongqing Central line high-speed railway.

Railway stations
There are 12 stations along the line:

Sichuan section
Chengdu East railway station
Jianyang South railway station
Ziyang North railway station
Zizhong North railway station
Neijiang North railway station
Longchang North railway station

Chongqing section
Rongchang North railway station
Dazu railway station
Yongchuan East railway station
Bishan railway station
Shapingba railway station
Chongqing railway station

References

External links

High-speed railway lines in China
 
Rail transport in Chongqing
Rail transport in Sichuan